H. ferruginea may refer to: 
 Hirundinea ferruginea, the cliff flycatcher, a bird species
 Hopea ferruginea, a plant species found in Brunei, Indonesia and Malaysia

Synonyms
 Hannoa ferruginea, a synonym for Quassia sanguinea, a plant species found in Cameroon

See also
 Ferruginea (disambiguation)